In the Church of Jesus Christ of Latter-day Saints, a tabernacle is a multipurpose religious building, used for church services and conferences, and as community centers. Tabernacles were typically built as endeavors of multiple congregations (termed wards or branches), usually at the stake level. They differ from meetinghouses in scale and differ from temples in purpose.

There were 79 total tabernacles built during the mid-to-late nineteenth and early twentieth century, usually within areas of the Mormon Corridor near the Rocky Mountains in North America that had predominantly Latter-day Saint populations. The largest such tabernacle is in Salt Lake City on Temple Square. The last tabernacle commissioned by the church was the Ogden Stake Tabernacle, built in the 1950s.

While some tabernacles are still used for a few ecclesiastical and community cultural activities, stake centers are now normally used in their place. Many tabernacles have been demolished, sold, or renovated, with two repurposed into temples (Vernal Utah Temple, Provo City Center Temple).

Prior to 2000, the Salt Lake Tabernacle on Temple Square was used twice a year for the church's general conferences.  In April 2000, the conferences moved one block north to the Conference Center.

References

External links